The highland frog (Lithobates maculatus), also known as the masked mountain frog, is a species of frog in the family Ranidae, known from El Salvador, Guatemala, Honduras, Mexico, and Nicaragua. Its natural habitats are subtropical or tropical moist lowland forests, subtropical or tropical moist montane forests, rivers, and freshwater marshes. It is threatened by habitat loss. 

Like other members of Lithobates, it is sometimes classified under the genus Rana.

References

Lithobates
Frogs of North America
Amphibians of Central America
Amphibians of Mexico
Least concern biota of North America
Least concern biota of Mexico
Taxonomy articles created by Polbot
Amphibians described in 1877